Azerbaijan has submitted films for the Academy Award for Best International Feature Film since 2007. The Academy Award for Best Foreign Language Film is handed out annually by the United States Academy of Motion Picture Arts and Sciences to a feature-length motion picture produced outside the United States that contains primarily non-English dialogue. It was not created until the 1956 Academy Awards, in which a competitive Academy Award of Merit, known as the Best Foreign Language Film Award, was created for non-English speaking films, and has been given annually since. , eight Azerbaijani films have been submitted for the Academy Award for Best Foreign Language Film, but none has yet received an Oscar nomination.

Submissions
The Academy of Motion Picture Arts and Sciences has invited the film industries of various countries to submit their best film for the Academy Award for Best Foreign Language Film since 1956. The Foreign Language Film Award Committee oversees the process and reviews all the submitted films. Following this, they vote via secret ballot to determine the five nominees for the award. Below is a list of the films that have been submitted by Azerbaijan for review by the academy for the award by year and the respective Academy Awards ceremony.

Azerbaijan was first invited by AMPAS to submit a film in the Best Foreign Language Film category in the summer of 2006, and they submitted for the first time in fall of 2007.

Azerbaijan's first Oscar submission was Caucasia by Farid Gumbatov, the story of an old woman leaving her war-torn Caucasian homeland for Russia, aboard a train. The following year, Azerbaijan sent Fortress, a drama about a film crew making a movie in an isolated mountain town famous for its ancient fortress, and what happens when the town is threatened by a modern-day foreign invasion. Neither film made much of an impact on the international film festival circuit, and neither film managed to get an Oscar nomination.

See also
List of Academy Award winners and nominees for Best Foreign Language Film
List of Academy Award-winning foreign language films
Cinema of Azerbaijan

Notes

References

External links
The Official Academy Awards Database
The Motion Picture Credits Database
IMDb Academy Awards Page
Review of Caucasia

Best Foreign Language Film Academy Award submissions by country
Academy Award